Catalan Patriotic Movement was a Spanish nationalist political organization active in Catalonia. Although the group used the rhetoric and symbols typical of Catalanism, it was actually an anti-independence far-right group. 

The MPC was the political wing of the paramilitary group Milícia Catalana, and the MPC was involved in several bombings.

Some ex-members of the MPC have joined Platform for Catalonia.

References 

Far-right political parties in Spain
Spanish nationalism
1994 establishments in Spain
Political parties established in 1994
Far-right politics in Catalonia